The Drive is the second album of dance artist Haddaway, which includes the three singles "Fly Away", "Catch a Fire" and "Lover Be Thy Name".

The album was released in many European countries on June 24, 1995. Although it met with success, this album obtained less extraordinary runnings in the various charts than those of the previous album, The Album. It managed, however, to reach #10 in Switzerland.

Track listing
 "Fly Away" (4:04)
 "I Know" (4:32)
 "Breakaway" (4:39)
 "Lover Be Thy Name" (3:47)
 "Waiting For a Better World" (4:25)
 "Give It Up" (4:15)
 "Catch a Fire" (4:15)
 "Desert Prayer" (5:50)
 "The First Cut Is the Deepest" (4:27)
 "Baby Don't Go" (3:56)
 "Freedom Is" (4:14)
 "Another Day Without You" (4:43)

Singles
The Single Fly Away was released on 29 May 1995
The single Catch a Fire was released on 31 July 1995
The Single Lover Be Thy Name was released on 6 August 1995

Credits
Executive producer – Dee Dee Halligan, Junior Torello
Photography by – Helge Strauß, Hester Doove
Producer – Alex Trime (tracks: 3), Halligan (tracks: 1, 2, 5, 7, 9, 10, 12), Desmond Child (tracks: 4, 8), Haddaway (tracks: 3, 4, 6, 8, 11), Torello (tracks: 1, 2, 5, 7, 9, 10, 12)

Charts

References

1995 albums
Haddaway albums
Arista Records albums
Albums produced by Desmond Child